Dyper, popularly known as DYPER, is an American brand of plant-based diapers. Founded in 2014 by Sergio Radovcic, Dyper was founded to create a 'safely compostable diaper', minimizing environmental impact. The company's main product, their bamboo diapers, are sold both direct to consumer on a subscription model, and in retail stores.

In 2020, the company raised $20m to expand their product range into other ranges in the baby and body categories. Dyper's product range includes plant-based training pants and cloth diapers, as well as wipes, creams and lotions.

History 
Dyper was founded in Scottsdale, Arizona in 2019 by Sergio Radovcic, a serial entrepreneur, as a challenger-brand 'sustainable alternative to traditional disposable diapers'. Phoenix Magazine noted Dyper 'originated from an idea that formed in [Radovcic's] mind while he wheeled garbage cans filled with his kids’ diapers week after week'. AP quoted their mission as 'to divert diapers from landfills'.

In 2020, Dyper acquired Earth Baby, based in the San Francisco Bay Area, which had been the only diaper composting service in the United States since 2008. The acquisition brought pickup and delivery to customers in the Bay Area, and allowed for expansion via local market delivery and in house composting. The company announced plans for local market expansion into Los Angeles, San Diego, Phoenix, and Las Vegas. By 2021, Dyper had 48 employees.

By early 2022, Dyper announced expansion to Thrive Market, followed by its first 'brick and mortar' availability in Whole Foods. This was followed by Walmart later in 2022. In late 2022, Forbes named Dyper the 'diaper delivery service of the year'.

In April 2022, Dyper announced a partnership with rePurpose Global to remove plastic waste from the environment, and their intention to be 'the first plastic-neutral diapers'. They later announced they had removed 100,000 kg of plastic waste from the environment.  Later in the year, Dyper announced they had become a B-Corp, and their intention to be 'the first plastic-neutral diapers'.

REDYPER and other 
REDYPER was announced by Dyper in 2020, partnering with TerraCycle to allow customers to 'compost [their diapers] by mail'. The Verge noted Dyper is the first compostable diaper, and the program works on a subscription model as an add-on service, sending boxes for users to return their diapers with.

Funding 
In October 2019, Dyper received investment from HCAP Partners. In 2020, Dyper raised a further $20m from existing investor HCAP and others.

Products 

 Dyper Diapers – bamboo fibre compostable diapers
 Dyper Bamboo Training Pants
 Dyper Bamboo Cloth Pants
 Dyper Compostable Baby Wipes
 Dyper Creams + Lotions
 Baby Wash/Shampoo

Products and distribution 
Dyper advertises their products as free from 'chlorine, latex, alcohol, lotions, TBT or Phthalates', and their diapers as made from bamboo fibers.

References 

Companies based in Scottsdale, Arizona
American companies established in 2018
Diapers